Don't Give Up the Ship may refer to:

 "Don't give up the ship", the dying command of James Lawrence in 1813 aboard USS Chesapeake
 "Don't Give Up the Ship", words on the battle flag of Oliver Hazard Perry in 1813 aboard USS Niagara
 Don't Give Up the Ship (film), a 1959 comedy
 Don't Give Up the Ship (game), a set of rules for naval war games

See also

 Don't Give Up the Sheep, a 1953 Chuck Jones cartoon